The 1872 State of the Union Address was given by Ulysses S. Grant, the 18th United States president, on December 2, 1872. He did not speak it to the 42nd United States Congress, because that was the custom at the time. He said, "In transmitting to you this my fourth annual message it is with thankfulness to the Giver of All Good that as a nation we have been blessed for the past year with peace at home, peace abroad, and a general prosperity vouchsafed to but few peoples."   It was given during the Reconstruction Era, when African Americans were freed.

References

State of the Union addresses
Presidency of Ulysses S. Grant
Works by Ulysses S. Grant
42nd United States Congress
State of the Union Address
State of the Union Address
State of the Union Address
December 1872 events
State of the Union